Llwynypia railway station is a railway station serving the town of Llwynypia in Wales. It is located on the Rhondda Line.

It was first opened on this site by the Taff Vale Railway in 1863. or 1871.

Services
Monday-Saturday daytime, there is a half-hourly service to  southbound and to  northbound (dropping to hourly in the late evening). There is a two hourly service in each direction on Sundays. On 20 July 2018, previous franchise operator Arriva Trains Wales announced a trial period of extra Sunday services on the Rhondda Line to Cardiff and Barry Island. This was in response to a survey by Leanne Wood and the success of extra Sunday services on the Merthyr Line and the Rhymney Line.

References

External links 

Railway stations in Rhondda Cynon Taf
DfT Category F2 stations
Railway stations in Great Britain opened in 1863
Railway stations served by Transport for Wales Rail